Basalt Rocks are volcanic rock outcrops in the form of columnar basalt located in Sinop Province, northern Turkey. The area is a registered natural monument of the country.

The basalt columns were formed about 3-5 million years ago according to research carried out by geologists from Mineral Research and Exploration Co. (MTA) and Dokuz Eylül University.

The basalt formations are situated in three neighboring valleys.

The formation, structure, and the outlook of the basalt rocks are rare examples in the world. It was declared a protected area of first grade on March 8, 1996 due to its geological and touristic importance. On September 17, 2007, the local administration applied to the Ministry of Forest and Water Management for acknowledgement as a natural monument. The area was registered a natural monument in 2011.

References

Columnar basalts
Natural monuments of Turkey
Landforms of Sinop Province
Protected areas established in 2011
2011 establishments in Turkey
Geology of Turkey